The 2022 Liga Panameña de Fútbol or 2022 Liga LPF (known as the Liga LPF Tigo for sponsorship reasons) was the 35th season of the Liga Panameña de Fútbol (LPF), the top-flight football league in Panama, and the third under the management of the Liga Panameña de Fútbol. The season began on 4 February 2022, when the Apertura tournament started, and ended on 12 November 2022 with the Clausura tournament Final.

The season was originally scheduled to start on 21 January 2022, but the date was pushed back due to the detection of several COVID-19 cases in the participating clubs.

A total of twelve teams competed throughout the entire season, which was divided into two championships: Torneo Apertura and Torneo Clausura, each of them being an independent championship and crowning its own champion.

Competition format
Same as previous years, the season was divided into two championships: Torneo Apertura and Torneo Clausura. Both Apertura and Clausura were played under the same format which consisted in a Classification stage, where the 12 teams were geographically divided into the Eastern and Western Conferences (6 teams per conference); Play-offs, Semifinals and Final.

Within each conference, teams played each other twice on a double round-robin format (home and away). In addition, each team played one game against all the 6 teams in the opposite conference for a total of 16 games per team in the classification stage. Winners of each conference qualified directly to the semi-finals, whilst the second and third placed teams advanced to the play-offs stage.

The Play-offs stage was played on a single-leg format between the second placed team of each conference against the third placed team of the opposite conference, with the second placed teams hosting the matches. Winners of play-offs advanced to semi-finals to play against the first placed team of each conference on a on a home-and-away two-legged basis. Winners of the semifinals played the final on a single-leg match at a venue and date determined by the LFP, with highest team ranked in the classification stage acting as the "home" team for "administrative purposes.

Teams
A total of 12 teams took part in this season; the same ones that played in the previous 2021 season, including San Francisco, which finished in the last place (12th) on the aggregate table of the 2021 season, which meant its relegation to the 2022 Liga Prom season. However, San Francisco was able to stay in the Liga LPF, subject to the payment of a financial penalty, since the champions and runners-up of the 2021 Liga Prom (Alianza FC II and Panamá Oeste) did not meet the requirements of the Liga Panameña de Fútbol to play in the 2022 Liga LPF.

Stadia and locations

Personnel and kits

Managerial changes

Notes

Torneo Apertura
The Torneo Apertura began on 4 February and ended on 28 May with the final.

Classification stage

Eastern Conference

Western Conference

Results

Bracket

Play-offs

Semi-finals

Alianza won 2–1 on aggregate and advanced to the final.

Sporting San Miguelito won 2–1 on aggregate and advanced to the final.

FInal

Top goalscorers
Players sorted first by goals scored, then by last name.

Torneo Clausura
The Torneo Clausura began on 22 July and ended on 12 November with the final.

Classification stage

Eastern Conference

Western Conference

Results

Bracket

Play-offs

Semi-finals

Independiente won 2–1 on aggregate and advanced to the final.

Universitario won 1–0 on aggregate and advanced to the final.

FInal

Top goalscorers
Players sorted first by goals scored, then by last name.

External links
Liga Panameña de Fútbol LPF 2022

References

Liga Panameña de Fútbol seasons
Panama
Panama